Cáchira is a Colombian municipality located in the department of Norte de Santander.

Gallery

References 

Municipalities of the Norte de Santander Department
Populated places established in 1811
1811 establishments in the Spanish Empire